Everything's Fine is the forthcoming third studio album by Australian singer Matt Corby. The album was announced on 11 January 2023, alongside second single, "Reelin'" and is scheduled for release on 24 March 2023 through Island Records Australia.

In a press statement Corby said the album's title was "not ironic, but intended to represent acceptance". On 15 February 2023, Corby released the album's third single "Big Smoke" and announced Everything's Fine tour dates, commencing in Melbourne on 22 May 2023.

The album's artwork was created by illustrator Niqui Toldi.

Track listing

References

2023 albums
Matt Corby albums
Albums produced by Matt Corby
Universal Music Australia albums
Upcoming albums